Fiumelatte is a river in northern Italy. It flows from a cavity in the Grigna into Lake Como, just south of Varenna, it has an approximate length of 250 m (820 ft). Leonardo da Vinci while staying in Lierna studied it for a long time and mentions it in his Atlantic Codex. In the 1600s the sons of the high nobility had to visit it as part of the Grand Tour to form their culture.

Overview
One of the river's peculiarities is its annual intermittency: it usually dries in the middle of October to reappear in the second half of March; therefore it has been given the nickname  ("River of the two Madonnas"), alluding to the festivities of Annunciation (March 25) and Madonna del Rosario (October 7). This phenomenon could imply that the river is the vent of an unexplored underground cavity in the Grigna, which gets periodically filled.

The river is mentioned by the name  in Leonardo da Vinci's Atlantic Codex:

Other authors who wrote about the river include Pliny the Elder and Lazzaro Spallanzani.

History
The village of Fiumelatte has a nearby memorial dedicated to members of a partisan brigade shot on January 8, 1945, following the capture of Esino Lario. The six partisans were killed after returning to the valley to alert the command of the encroachment in Switzerland.

References

External links
Fiumelatte 

Rivers of Italy
Rivers of Lombardy
Rivers of the Province of Lecco
Waterfalls of Lombardy